Lea Boy (born 24 January 2000) is a German open water swimmer.

In 2018, she finished in 12th place in the women's 5 km at the 2018 European Aquatics Championships.

She participated at the 2019 World Aquatics Championships, winning a medal.

In 2019, she represented the Germany at the 2019 World Aquatics Championships in Gwangju, South Korea. She competed in the women's 25 km event and she finished in 12th place.

References

External links

2000 births
Living people
German female swimmers
German female freestyle swimmers
World Aquatics Championships medalists in open water swimming
German female long-distance swimmers
Swimmers at the 2015 European Games
European Games competitors for Germany
European Aquatics Championships medalists in swimming
Sportspeople from Würzburg